Joseph Douhadji (born 5 December 1994) is a Togolese football defender for Black Leopards.

References

1994 births
Living people
Togolese footballers
Togo international footballers
Dolphin F.C. (Nigeria) players
Rivers United F.C. players
Adana Demirspor footballers
Bidvest Wits F.C. players
Black Leopards F.C. players
TFF First League players
South African Premier Division players
Association football defenders
Togolese expatriate footballers
Expatriate footballers in Nigeria
Togolese expatriate sportspeople in Nigeria
Expatriate footballers in Turkey
Togolese expatriate sportspeople in Turkey
Expatriate soccer players in South Africa
Togolese expatriate sportspeople in South Africa
21st-century Togolese people